Scopula rubraria is a species of moth of the family Geometridae. It is native to both New Zealand and Australia.

Taxonomy
This species was first described by Edward Doubleday in 1843 and originally named Ptychopoda rubraria.

Description

Distribution
It is found throughout New Zealand and in the coastal regions of south eastern Australia and throughout Tasmania.

Host species
The larvae feed on Plantago lanceolata.

References

rubraria
Moths of Australia
Moths described in 1843
Moths of New Zealand
Taxa named by Edward Doubleday